Aries Moross is an English graphic designer, artist, illustrator and art director based in London. They mostly focus on lettering and typography in their works of art.

Aries Moross has been profiled in Dazed & Confused, Vice magazine and Creative Review, who selected them for a Creative Future award in 2007.

Moross ran with the Torch in Lewisham for the London Olympics 2012.

Aries is non-binary and uses they/them pronouns.

Illustration & Design

Moross is also known for typographic illustration. Their achievements include a nationwide billboard campaign for Cadburys, a signature clothing range for Topshop. and illustrations for Vogue Magazine. Moross sat on the jury for the D&AD Awards in 2012.

Moving Image

Moross joined Pulse Films as a director in 2010 and has directed music videos for Alpines, Simian Mobile Disco, and Jessie Ware. Their names have since been removed from the Pulse Films website.

Education

Moross attended South Hampstead High School for primary and secondary school, going on to study art foundation at Wimbledon School of Art, before going on to complete a BA Degree at Camberwell School of Art in 2008.

Isomorph Records

In 2007 Moross launched vinyl only record label, Isomorph Records, set up in order to explore further the relationship between design and music. The label has seen releases from Cutting Pink With Knives, Hearts Revolution, Midnight Juggernauts Apes and Androids and Pictureplane. With each release Moross collaborated closely with the artists in order to create the definitive visual representation of their sound, that encapsulates the bands ideas and Moross’ vision for them. In 2008 Aries Moross was named at number 18 in the NME’s Future 50 innovators driving music forward.

Studio Moross

In 2012 Moross founded Studio Moross, which focuses on music-based projects. Moross currently acts as art director for British singer Jessie Ware and has directed several music videos for them, including "Running, 'Wildest Moments' and 'If You're Never Gonna Move'.

References

External links 
 
 Studio Moross website

1986 births
Living people
English graphic designers
English illustrators
English art directors
People educated at South Hampstead High School
Non-binary artists
Queer artists
Queer people
21st-century LGBT people